Yaro Oral is a 1978 Malayalam film written, produced and directed by V. K. Pavithran. It was his debut as a director.  It is one of the first early experiments in Malayalam cinema which introduced to a genre of personal cinema, which is deliberately anti-realist. It deals with cynicism about the death through the suicide of a woman. The film's music is composed by acclaimed film director G. Aravindan.

Cast
  Protima as Malathi
  T. Ravindranath as Hari
  Verma as Malathi's First Husband
  A. C. K. Raja as Moorthy, the artist

References

External links
 

1978 films
1970s Malayalam-language films
1978 directorial debut films